Massilia jejuensis is a Gram-negative, aerobic, rod-shaped, motile bacterium with a single flagellum from the genus Massilia and family Oxalobacteraceae, which was isolated with Naxibacter suwonensis from air samples in the Jeju Island and Suwon region of Korea. Colonies of M. jejuensis are light orange.

Etymology
The specific name jejuensis comes from the name "Jeju Island" where this type strain was found.

References

External links
Type strain of Massilia jejuensis at BacDive -  the Bacterial Diversity Metadatabase

Burkholderiales
Bacteria described in 2010